Penicillium spathulatum is a species of fungus in the genus Penicillium which produces asperphenamate.

References

Further reading 
 

spathulatum
Fungi described in 2012